William Toye may refer to:

William J. Toye (1913–2018), American art forger
William Toye (author) (born 1926), Canadian writer